ARCHOS 43 Internet Tablet is a discontinued 4.3-inch tablet computer designed and developed by Archos in the ARCHOS Generation 8 Internet Tablets line. The Archos 43 runs Android 2.2 Froyo of the Android operating system. It was released globally in early November 2010. It was met with mixed reviews, with its biggest overall complaint being its resistive touchscreen.

Pre-installed applications
On the ARCHOS 43 Internet Tablet several applications are installed by default. Users are able to add applications through Appslib, an application marketplace.

 Webbrowser
 Email
 Contacts
 Appslib
 Twitter
 Wikipedia
 Weather Channel
 Ebuddy
 Deezer
 Mewbox For users from the United Kingdom
 Napster For users from the United States
 Racing Thunderlight
 World Newspaper

See also
 Archos 70
 Archos 101

References

Tablet computers
Touchscreen portable media players
Tablet computers introduced in 2010
Android (operating system) devices